Face Your Fear is the second studio album by American singer Curtis Harding, released October 27, 2017, by Anti-.

Reception

Mark Deming writes, "Curtis Harding can write and sing like a soul man with a mind of his own, and here he sounds even more open, expressive, and fearless than he did on his very fine debut. Face Your Fear ups the ante for Harding, bumping him from promising newcomer to major artist, and if you like good songs played and sung with true conviction, you won't want to sleep on this." The song, "On and On" was used for the ending scene of the Disney+ MCU television series, The Falcon and the Winter Soldier.

Track listing
Adapted from AllMusic.

Personnel
Adapted from AllMusic.
 Josh Aguiar – trumpet
 John Anderson – celesta, guitar
 Sasami Ashworth – string arrangements
 Chris Camacho – bass
 David Christian – drums
 Sam Cohen – bass, composer, drums, guitar, keyboards, mixing, producer
 Matthew Correia – photography
 Danger Mouse – composer, producer
 Tomas Dolas – organ
 Jeremy Gill – saxophone
 Curtis Harding – composer, guitar, primary artist, producer, vocals
 Trevor Hernandez – design
 Oliver Hill – viola, violin
 Nic Jodoin – composer, producer
 Ali Jones – cello
 Joe LaPorta – mastering
 Amber Mark – background vocals
 Raymond Mason – French horn, trombone
 Nick Murray – drums
 Elizabeth Pupo-Walker – percussion
 Gillian Rivers – violin
 Hedi Slimane – cover photo
 Derek Stein – cello
 Matt Zuk – guitar

Charts

References

External links
 

2017 albums
Curtis Harding albums
Anti- (record label) albums
Albums produced by Danger Mouse (musician)